France was the host nation for the 1924 Winter Olympics in Chamonix. For the first time in modern Olympics history, the host nation did not win a gold medal.

Medalists

Bobsleigh

Cross-country skiing

Men

Curling 

Team

Standings

|}

Figure skating

Men

Women

Pairs

Ice hockey

Group B
The top two teams (highlighted) advanced to the medal round.

Military patrol

Nordic combined 

Events:
 18 km cross-country skiing
 normal hill ski jumping

The cross-country skiing part of this event was combined with the main medal event of cross-country skiing. Those results can be found above in this article in the cross-country skiing section. Some athletes (but not all) entered in both the cross-country skiing and Nordic combined event, their time on the 18 km was used for both events. One would expect that athletes competing at the Nordic combined event, would participate in the cross-country skiing event as well, as they would have the opportunity to win more than one medal. This was not always the case due to the maximum number of athletes (here: 4) could represent a country per event.

The ski jumping (normal hill) event was held separate from the main medal event of ski jumping, results can be found in the table below.

Ski jumping

Speed skating

Men

All-round 
Distances: 500m; 5000m; 1500m & 10,000m.

References

Olympic Winter Games 1924, full results by sports-reference.com

Nations at the 1924 Winter Olympics
1924
Olympics, Winter